Chandril Bhattacharya is a popular Bengali essayist, lyricist, poet, orator and director from Kolkata.

Music
Bhattacharya is one of the main lyricists of the Bengali band Chandrabindoo and also occasionally sings for them. His idiomatic lyrics are laced with satire and critique of modern society. Chandril, together with Anindya Chatterjee won the 2010 National Film Award for Best Lyrics for the song "Pherari Mon" in the film Antaheen (2009).

Education
He completed his schooling from Ramakrishna Mission Vidyalaya, Narendrapur. He credited his alma mater for the nourishment of his cultural side. 
He earned an undergraduate degree in economics as a student at Bidhannagar College and subsequently pursued an MSc degree in economics from the University of Calcutta. 
He studied in Satyajit Ray Film and Television Institute (1st Batch) (1996-2000) and earned a Diploma in Film Direction and Screenwriting.
He married Sanchari Mukherjee in 2006.

Writing
Chandril Bhattacharya formerly wrote the monthly column "Uttam Madhyam" for Anandabazar Patrika, contributing to occasional op-eds and Cover stories for Sunday Supplement in the same newspaper. His Uttam Madhyam pieces were collected as a book. Later, he began to air his views in the weekly Robbar Pratidin, in a column entitled "Du Chhokka Pnaach" ("two sixes and a five" – the highest score you can get in a single turn in the popular board game Ludo). In January 2011 his "Du Chhokka Pnaach" became bi-weekly. His satirical viewpoints addressed cultural phenomena, national and international current affairs, human psychology and social norms. He coins peculiar idioms, playful jargon, Spoonerisms and reconstructs colloquial Bengali phrases and expressions to formulate absurdist, humorous puns in most of his articles.

Published books
1. Dhur Dhur A Porobaase Ke Thakbe (ধুর ধুর এ পরবাসে কে থাকবে): Collection of poems [Pratibhaas Publications] (2008)

2. Uttam Maadhyom (উত্তম মাধ্যম): Collection of bi-weekly Sunday columns of the same name, published in Anandabazar Patrika [Pratibhaas Publications] (2009)

3. Ras Kosh Singara Bulbuli Mastak (রস কষ সিঙাড়া বুলবুলি মস্তক): Collection of articles from Anandabazar Patrika [Dey's Publishing] (2011)

4. Ha Ha Hi Hi Ho Ho O Onyanyo (হাহা হিহি হোহো ও অন্যান্য): Collection of seven articles published in Robbar, Pratidin [Dey's Publishing] (2011)

5. Ugo Bugo Chouko Chugo (উগো বুগো চৌকো চুগো): Collection of poems [Dey's Publishing] (2012)

6. Du Chhokka Pnaach (দু ছক্কা পাঁচ): Collection of selected writings from the column 'Du Chhokka Pnaach' published in Robbar, Pratidin [Dey's Publishing] (2015)

7. Sondher Songe Casual Guley (সন্ধের সঙ্গে ক্যাজুয়াল গুলে): Collection of poems [Dey's Publishing] (2015)

8. Soruchaakli (সরুচাকলি): Collection of poems [Guruchandali] (2017)

9. Rowabnaama (রোয়াবনামা): Collection of selected writings from a 'Person of the week' type satirical column in Anandabazar Patrika [Saptarshi Prakashan] (2018)

10. Ghawno Chokkor (ঘন চক্কর): Collection of selected essays from Anandabazar Patrika [Dey's Publishing] (2018)

11. Chattikhani (চাট্টিখানি): Collection of 4-line poems (clerihews) about renowned people [Dey's Publishing] (2021)

12. Something Something (সামথিং সামথিং): Collection of selected essays from the column 'Something Something' published in Cultural Portal Daakbangla.com [Daakbangla & Dey's Publishing] (2022)

Film
He wrote and directed a short film named Y2K (Athoba, 'Sex Krome Aasitechhe'), from Satyajit Ray Film and Television Institute in the year 2000. The music/ lyrics of this film was composed by his band Chandrabindoo. In 2017, he wrote and directed a short film named  'Talent' and released it on Youtube. He also wrote and directed 'Praay Kafka', a short film (a part of anthology 'Paanch Phoron 2'), which was released on Hoichoi ott-platform in 2020, under the banner of SVF.

References 

University of Calcutta alumni
Bengali male poets
Bengali musicians
Living people
Best Lyrics National Film Award winners
Year of birth missing (living people)
Musicians from Kolkata